The European Seniors Match Play Championship was a senior (over 50s) men's professional match play golf tournament played on the European Seniors Tour from 2000 to 2004. In 2000 and 2001 it was held at Penina Golf, Portimão, on the Algarve, Portugal, while from 2002 to 2004 it was held at Flamingos Golf, Marbella, Málaga, Spain. Prize money totalled £100,000.

The event was contested by 32 golfers and was played over four days with the first three rounds played on the opening three days and the semi-final and final played on the final day. All matches were over 18 holes with extra holes played if required to achieve a result. The winner received £16,000 with £11,000 for the losing finalist. Losing semi-finalists received £7,500, losing quarter-finalists £5,000, second round losers £2,500 and first round losers £1,125.

Winners

References

Former European Senior Tour events
Golf tournaments in Portugal
Golf tournaments in Spain
Recurring sporting events established in 2000
Recurring sporting events disestablished in 2004